Marcus Dwayne Tubbs (born May 16, 1981) is a former American football defensive tackle. He was drafted by the Seattle Seahawks 23rd overall in the 2004 NFL Draft. He played college football at Texas, where he served as the director of football operations. In December 2016 Tubbs was hired as assistant athletics director for football operations at the University of Houston.

Early years
Tubbs was born in Dallas, Texas on May 16, 1981. Tubbs played basketball at DeSoto High School and did not start playing football until his junior year, in high school he played Tight End. He earned first-team All-District honors in his senior year. He earned 353 yards with 28 catches and two touchdowns. He was a starter for his basketball team for 3 years in a row.

College career
Playing for the Texas Longhorns Tubbs started 37 games of the 48 he played in, he made the transfer to the Defensive Line from Tight End in college. He finished his college career with 205 tackles and 19.5 sacks. He forced 2  fumbles and 12 of his tackles caused a loss of yardage.

Professional career

Seattle Seahawks
Tubbs played for the Seattle Seahawks for four years. He was considered to have substantial talent, but was plagued with injuries over his career.

During his rookie year in 2004 he played in 11 games. He recorded six solo tackles and seven assisted tackles, thirteen in total. He also recorded one forced fumble and one sack.

In 2005, he played in 13 games. He recorded twenty-seven solo tackles and thirteen assisted tackles, 40 in total. He recorded 6 sacks and 2 forced fumbles as well.

In 2006, after playing in 5 games, Tubbs was placed on injured reserve with a knee injury that required microfracture surgery. Before the injury, he recorded four solo tackles and three assisted tackles for seven tackles in total, along with a half-sack.

In 2007, he was placed on injured reserve during pre-season and did not play any games.

On August 11, 2008, he was released from the Seahawks, although head coach Mike Holmgren indicated that the team would be interested in re-signing Tubbs when he recovers from his injuries, though this never came to be.

See also
List of Seattle Seahawks first-round draft picks

References

External links
 Seattle Seahawks bio

1981 births
Living people
American football defensive tackles
Texas Longhorns football players
Seattle Seahawks players